American Century Investments is a privately controlled and independent investment management firm.

Operations
The Building has approximately 1,300 employees and its headquarters are located at 4500 Main in Kansas City, Missouri, near the Country Club Plaza; the company also has offices in New York, London, Hong Kong, Sydney, Mountain View, California and Kansas City, Missouri.

History

The company was founded by James E. Stowers Jr. in 1958 as "Twentieth Century Mutual Funds", a family of no-load funds, in Kansas City, Missouri. Stowers started the funds in 1958 with just $100,000 in assets from 24 shareholders. He built his business concentrating on small investors. The company changed its name to American Century Investments in 1997. American Century's headquarters are located at 4500 Main in Kansas City, Missouri, near the Country Club Plaza, and employs around 1,300 people.

In 2011, JP Morgan Chase sold their 41% stake in ACI to Toronto based bank CIBC. CIBC resold its stake to Nomura Holdings in 2015 for around $1 billion as it could not gain full control of ACI. The stake gave Nomura 10.1% of the voting rights. The Stowers Institute for Medical Research holds the controlling majority stake in the company. Between 2000 and 2019, the institute received over $1.1 billion in dividends from American Century.

The company paid a $1.5 million settlement to its current and former employees after the United States Department of Justice found that it broke anti-trust laws by conspiring with another company to not compete for employees. In August 2021, the company announced a vaccine mandate, requiring its employees to get the COVID-19 vaccine.

Since 1999, American Century has sponsored the American Century Championship, an annual celebrity golf tournament held at Edgewood Tahoe Resort in July. A fantasy golf contest was added to the championship in 2021.

Subsidiary 

 American Century Investment Management, Inc.
 American Century Investment Management (Asia Pacific) Limited
 American Century Investment Management (UK) Limited
 American Century Investment Services, Inc.

References

External links
 

Investment management companies of the United States
Companies based in Kansas City, Missouri
Financial services companies established in 1958
American companies established in 1958
1958 establishments in Missouri